RCTC may refer to:

 Rewritable consumer timecode
 Riverside County Transportation Commission
 RollerCoaster Tycoon Classic
 Rose City Transit Company, a former mass transit provider in Portland, Oregon
 Rochester Community and Technical College, at University Center Rochester
 Royal Calcutta Turf Club